Paolo Ravaglia is a clarinetist.

Discography

With Alter Ego
Toshio Hosokawa: Birds Fragments
Sciarrino: Fiato
Glass: Music in the Shape of a Square
Salvatore Sciarrino: Esplorazione del Bianco

Source:

References

External links
 https://web.archive.org/web/20070927140959/http://www.conservatorio-bologna.com/index.php?option=content&task=view&id=113
 https://web.archive.org/web/20060512101653/http://www.alteregogroup.it/
 http://www.nuovaconsonanza.it -"
 https://web.archive.org/web/20110718024116/http://www.radio.rai.it/filodiffusione/4canale/view.cfm?Q_EV_ID=101704&Q_PROG_ID= -"
 https://web.archive.org/web/20060603062842/http://www.cematitalia.it/servizi/profilierepertori/interpreti/r/ravaglia.htm -"

1959 births
Italian clarinetists
Academic staff of the Conservatorio Giovanni Battista Martini
Living people
21st-century clarinetists